Nicholas O'Hare (born 27 June 1972) is an Irish former swimmer. He competed in the men's 50 metre freestyle event at the 1996 Summer Olympics.

References

External links
 

1972 births
Living people
Irish male swimmers
Olympic swimmers of Ireland
Swimmers at the 1996 Summer Olympics
Place of birth missing (living people)
20th-century Irish people
21st-century Irish people